KDRW (88.7 MHz) is a non-commercial FM radio station that is licensed to Santa Barbara, California. The station is owned by Santa Monica College and mostly simulcasts KCRW and its public radio format, a mix of news, talk and specialty music programs, some produced by KCRW and some from NPR. However, KDRW also originates some programming locally from its studios on the campus of Antioch University Santa Barbara.

KDRW has an effective radiated power (ERP) of 12,000 watts, using HD Radio technology.  The transmitter is off Gibraltar Road in Santa Barbara, amid the towers for other local FM and TV stations.

History

In , the station signed on as KSCA. Owned by the University of Southern California (USC), the non-commercial KSCA broadcast classical music programming as a simulcast of KUSC. The call letters changed to KFAC in 1991, then to KQSC in 2004.

In February 2014, public radio station KCRW, based in Santa Monica, California, purchased Santa Barbara classical station KDB for $1 million.  The acquisition allowed KCRW to extend its reach into the Santa Barbara area. With the Santa Barbara market facing the possible elimination of classical radio programming, USC purchased KDB and that station began relaying KUSC's programming. Upon closing the transaction on August 27, 2014 — a deal which also saw KQSC going to KCRW — KQSC changed its call sign to KDRW-FM and began simulcasting KCRW. The station's call letters changed again on October 1, 2014, to simply KDRW.

Unlike a typical repeater station that simply rebroadcasts its parent station's programming, KDRW offers some locally originated programming. The station's Santa Barbara studios are located on the campus of Antioch University Santa Barbara. Local news reports are made in cooperation with the Santa Barbara Independent weekly newspaper and a local nonprofit organization specializing in investigative journalism.

References

External links

NPR member stations
Public radio stations in the United States
Radio stations of the University of Southern California
1985 establishments in California
Radio stations established in 1985